National Lampoon's Senior Trip is a 1995 American comedy film for the National Lampoon magazine franchise, directed by Kelly Makin. It marked Jeremy Renner's film debut.

Plot
At Fairmount High School, Ohio in the suburbs of Dayton, a group of teenage students begin their school with an assembly featuring a band called "High on Life", though they are selfish at teachers and the principal. As the band continues to play onstage, Mark "Dags" D'Agastino and Reggie Barry decide to sabotage the assembly by exposing the band is lip syncing their music and playing the song recordings at inappropriate times. After a typing class (during which the teacher suffers a heart attack and dies), the seniors cut school and throw a party for Principal Moss. Moss eventually gets informed about the party from the student body president Steve Nisser. When he returns home, he gives the group detention, forcing them to write a letter to the President of the United States, explaining what is wrong with the education system.

The next day while arriving at school, Moss and the new typing class teacher notices that various newspaper station vans are there assuming that something has gone wrong within the building. Mrs. Winston tells him that John Lerman is inside the building after meeting the seniors. Moss makes the announcement over them being invited by the President, who amazingly enjoyed their letter, to Washington, D.C. to discuss it. However, it is actually just a plot devised by the corrupt U.S. Senator to humiliate the President. The bus arrives at a convenience store, where Dags and Reggie lock Moss in a flooded washroom, and they steal alcoholic beverages. They are pursued by Travis, a crazed Star Trek fan and crossing guard, who hitches a ride with an Asian family. While on their way, Moss falls into a "coma" after taking pills given to him by bus driver Red. At this point, the students go on a rampage celebrating over Moss passing out and throw another party, while Carla Morgan, the school slut, puts makeup on Moss.

The next day, the bus is pursued by Travis and the police. Red apparently dies from a drug overdose, and the bus nearly plows into a lake. Dags manages to stop it in time, but the car lands on the water and Travis escapes. Arriving at Washington, the group checks into a hotel and decides to take a class photo at a cemetery. Miosky uses fart lighting on J. Edgar Hoover's flame to distract Travis. That night, the seniors secretly lace a box of chocolates with tequila and give it to Miss Milford. When Milford seduces Moss, the students begin to leave to go to a party at the hotel next door, but Steve Nisser threatens to blow the whistle. Dags orders Mioski to take care of him. At the hotel, while the other students enjoy the party, Lisa Perkins takes Dags to the rooftop where she seduces him. The next day, she suddenly discovers the plot to use the students and embarrass the President.

At the same time, Senator Lerman unexpectedly wakes up Moss and Milford, who—shocked at finding themselves in the same room—prepare themselves and the seniors for their meeting with the President. However, when they open the room, they do not find them there but only a tied-up Steve Nisser. Moss and Milford find the missing students, as they are informed of Lerman's plot as Lerman baffles to the discovery. The senator subsequently kidnaps Miosky and takes him to the White House with the others in hot pursuit. When they arrive at the White House, the senator insults the seniors, but Moss unexpectedly stands up for them. The senator's plot is ultimately exposed and the seniors return home. The film ends with a montage of the characters and where they ended up after the events.

Cast

Reception

Box office

The film opened to $2,184,901 from 1,397 theaters with the average to 1,563 per site. The United States had $3,686,337; it was 78% of the total gross of the film. The overseas gross was $1,000,600 and it brought the film to $4,686,937.

Critical response
The film received overwhelmingly negative reviews, earning a 0% approval rating on Rotten Tomatoes website, but it currently holds a B grade at Yahoo! Movies.

References

External links

 
 
 
 

1995 films
1990s adventure comedy films
1990s comedy road movies
American adventure comedy films
American comedy road movies
1990s English-language films
Films about alcoholism
Films set in Ohio
Films set in Washington, D.C.
National Lampoon films
1990s teen comedy films
Films scored by Steve Bartek
1995 comedy films
Films directed by Kelly Makin
1990s American films